WWIZ was a commercial radio station at  that was licensed to Lorain, Ohio, and broadcast from 1958 to 1967.

The station shut down when its license was revoked by the Federal Communications Commission after the principal owner failed to notify the agency of an ownership transfer weeks prior to signing on. An unrelated radio station, WLRO, signed on in December 1969 using the same transmitter as WWIZ; it continues on the air today as WDLW.

History 
The second AM station in Lorain County, WWIZ signed on October 26, 1958. It was the first radio station to directly serve the city of Lorain, with studios in the city's downtown and a transmitter residing in adjacent Sheffield Township. The station was founded by Sanford A. Schafitz, a native of the Youngstown area; Schafitz also started up WFAR in Farrell, Pennsylvania and WXTV, an independent TV station in Youngstown.

Among the early radio hosts at "W-WIZ" included Bob Lockwood, Alan Mink, Jeff Baxter (who doubled as program director), Bob Lee and Bob "BJ" Sellers, later known as "The Polka King", in the morning slot.

While the station soon promoted itself as "Lorain's Most Listened to Radio Station", behind the scenes, WWIZ's history was troubled right from the start. On September 15, 1958—one month before the station signed on—Schafitz arranged a deal with The Journal in Lorain. The Journal, as it turned out, was a party that actually tried to get the station assigned in the first place via a complicated straw-man transaction designed to circumvent the legal requirements which prevented Journal Publishing from holding a license. The station was incorporated as "WWIZ, Inc.", and while the Journal was not the controlling shareholder of WWIZ (the ratio was 55 percent to 45 percent in favor of Schafitz, who now held the titles of president and director), it ended up controlling the operations nonetheless. (It later emerged that The Journal had avoided 100 percent ownership in order to avoid jeopardizing its chances at buying WCLW of Mansfield; that sale application was later dismissed.) In return for the authorized nonvoting and voting preferred stock, The Journal paid Schafitz a total of $56,000, a transaction later cited by the FCC as a means to finance WXTV's construction, and also for The Journal to get a competitive edge over the Elyria-Lorain Broadcasting Co., owner of WEOL AM/FM.

Schafitz, however, told the Federal Communications Commission (FCC) that he held total control of the station at the time, and the deal was not made public until announced on February 26, 1959. Harry Horvitz, chief owner of Journal Publishing, then bought the station outright on June 20, 1961. Both WEOL and the FCC soon objected to the move, as neither was properly notified of the previous action. WWIZ's license renewal was designated for hearing by the FCC in March 1962 as part of a review of all of Schafitz's holdings; at the Youngstown TV station, it was revealed that Schafitz also failed to disclose to the agency that WXTV's 50 percent owner, Guy W. Gully, was indicted for a felony. Also in question was Schafitz's status of involvement at WWIZ; the FCC found that his time devoted to the operations decreased dramatically after its first six months on the air to the point he spent no time at the station from May 1960 onward. The FCC's Broadcast Bureau's findings stated that Schafitz was willing to sell a share in WWIZ to The Journal and Horvitz "upon such conditions as Horvitz would dictate" and concluded that neither Schafitz, Horvitz nor The Journal had the character qualifications to hold a broadcast license. Hearing examiner Chester F. Naumowicz, Jr., initially recommended renewal of the WWIZ license.

On March 25, 1964, the FCC issued the decision to deny the license renewals of WWIZ and WXTV and ordered them off the air by June 1. However, the FCC allowed the license for WFAR to be renewed, finding that its programming was satisfactory; it continues operations to this day as WLOA. (In 1965, in a first-of-its-kind decision, a federal appeals court ruled that the FCC was in its right to allow WFAR to continue even while denying the WWIZ renewal, saying that the FCC's investigation had generally found "favorable" findings regarding the Farrell operation.) WXTV's channel allocation was reassigned to Alliance as an educational frequency and was eventually occupied by WNEO. The license denial for WWIZ was appealed before the Supreme Court and ultimately was upheld in late 1966. The station was allowed to remain on the air on a temporary basis until being ordered silent on July 14, 1967; a WWIZ staff announcer arrived at the studios the next day and found it was no longer broadcasting.

Schafitz died of heart failure on May 30, 1979, at the age of 53.

1380 after WWIZ

Even while WWIZ remained on the air, applications reached the FCC to operate a new station on the frequency it was about to vacate. The first of these, filed in May 1966, came from Lorain Community Broadcasting, with Allied Broadcasting following closely thereafter. They were soon joined by Midwest Broadcasting; all three applications were placed in comparative hearing. All three applicants sought to operate the 1380 facility on an interim basis until the FCC selected a permanent licensee, but since the Lorain Community and Midwest applicants did not want to associate with Allied, which had alleged connections with principals of The Journal, the FCC denied their applications.

The FCC initially ruled in favor of Midwest Broadcasting in August 1967, but in June 1968, it reversed its decision and granted the Lorain Community Broadcasting application instead. Lorain selected new WLRO call letters for its station (for LoRain, Ohio). 1380 returned to the air December 4, 1969, when WLRO received program authority to begin broadcasts; it would receive its full license in 1970.

References 

 FCC case: WWIZ, Inc., 37 FCC 685, 686 (1964), aff'd sub nom. Lorain Journal Co. v. FCC, 351 F. 2d 824 (D.C. Cir. 1965), cert. denied, 383 U.S. 967 (1966)

1958 establishments in Ohio
1967 disestablishments in Ohio
Radio stations established in 1958
Radio stations disestablished in 1967
Defunct radio stations in the United States
WIZ
WIZ
Lorain, Ohio
WIZ
WIZ